The 2015 Iowa Barnstormers season was the team's fifteenth season as a professional indoor football franchise and first in the Indoor Football League (IFL). One of ten teams competing in the IFL for the 2015 season, the Iowa Barnstormers are members of the United Conference. The team plays their home games at the Wells Fargo Arena in the Des Moines, Iowa.

Schedule
Key:

Regular season
All start times are local time

Standings

Roster

References

Iowa Barnstormers seasons
Iowa Barnstormers
Iowa Barnstormers